Paul Michel Gabriel, Baron Lévy (27 November 1910 – 16 August 2002) was a Belgian journalist and professor. He was born in Brussels and was a Holocaust survivor. He worked for many years as Director of Information at the Council of Europe, helping to create the Flag of Europe in the 1950s in collaboration with Arsène Heitz.

Early career
Before the war, Lévy directed the information services of the Belgian national broadcaster, the Institut National de Radiodiffusion (INR). Under the occupation, he refused to collaborate with the German-backed radio and was sacked and arrested. He was sent to Fort Breendonk, a German prison camp near Mechelen. Released in 1941, he was placed under surveillance by the German authorities in Brussels, but succeeded in escaping to Britain via the Zéro network in July 1942 where he joined Antoine Delfosse, minister and commander of the Armée de la Libération (AL) the principal resistance group. He served alongside Delfosse in the Ministry of Justice of the Belgian government in London. He also spoke on Radio Belgique, the French and Dutch language radio station of the BBC broadcast to occupied Belgium. His principal work, however, was in the Commission belge pour l'étude des problèmes d'après-guerre ("Belgian Commission of study of post-war problems"), in which he founded Mission Samoyède which planned to set up radio broadcasting in Belgium soon after the liberation. Following the invasion of Europe by the Allies, he returned to the continent working as an interpreter and press officer alongside General Henning Linden. His coverage included the liberation of Dachau concentration camp.

After the Liberation, and despite having Socialist leanings, he worked for the new Belgian Democratic Union (UDB-BDU) party. In 1946, he was elected deputy for the Nivelles region as the only successful candidate of the UDB-BDU. He resigned to return to radio work.

He is said to have invented the neologism Irénologie which is the French term for the study of Peace.

Later life

Council of Europe
Lévy had converted to Catholicism in July 1940. In 1950, he joined the staff of Winston Churchill's newly established Council of Europe and became the first Chief of its Department of Culture.

Flag

Lévy had to sort through the proposals flooding into his department and drew up the exact design of the finalist Arsène Heitz's proposal for a circle of stars.

According to an anecdote published in 1998 in Die Welt, 
Lévy passed a statue of the Virgin Mary with a halo of stars and was struck by the way the stars, reflecting the sun, glowed against the blue of the sky. Lévy later visited Léon Marchal, the then Secretary General of the Council of Europe, and suggested that he should propose twelve golden stars on a blue ground as the motif for the flag of Europe.

On the other hand, a 2004 article in The Economist attributed a statement to Heitz, in which he claims to have been inspired by Revelations 12:1. 
Lévy has stated that he was only informed of the connection to the Book of Revelation after it was chosen.

Honours
 Created Baron by RD of king Albert II; 2000.
 Grand Officer in the Order of Leopold.
 Grand Officer in the Order of the Crown.
 Grand Officer in the Order of Leopold II.
 Commander in the Pontifical Equestrian Order of Saint Sylvester Pope and Martyr

References

1910 births
2002 deaths
Breendonk prison camp survivors
Belgian Jews
Belgian radio journalists
Belgian Roman Catholics
Converts to Roman Catholicism from Judaism
Council of Europe people
History of the European Union
Belgian people in the United Kingdom during World War II
Belgian resistance members
Jewish resistance members during the Holocaust
Barons of Belgium
Flag designers